Rosedale Historic District or Rosedale Park Historic District may refer to:

Rosedale Historic District (Homewood, Alabama), listed on the NRHP in Alabama
Rosedale Park Historic District (Homewood, Alabama), listed on the NRHP in Alabama
Rosedale Park Historic District (Detroit, Michigan), listed on the NRHP in Michigan
Rosedale Historic District (Rosedale, Mississippi), listed on the NRHP in Mississippi
Rosedale Historic District (Covington, Virginia), listed on the NRHP in Virginia